{{DISPLAYTITLE:C20H14O4}}
The molecular formula C20H14O4 (molar mass: 318.32 g/mol) may refer to:
 diphenyl isophthalate (CA number 744-45-6)
 diphenyl terephthalate (CAS number 1539-04-4)
 phenolphthalein (CAS number 77-09-8)
 resorcinol dibenzoate (CAS number 94-01-9)
 xestoquinone